The following lists events that happened during 1813 in Chile.

Incumbents
Royal Governor of Chile (in opposition): José Antonio Pareja (-21 May), Juan Francisco Sánchez (21 May-)

President of the Provisional Government Junta: José Miguel Carrera Verdugo (-8 April), Patriot
President of the Superior Junta: Francisco Antonio Pérez (12 April-23 August), Patriot, José Miguel Infante (23 August-), Patriot

Events

April
27 April - Battle of Yerbas Buenas

May
15 May - Battle of San Carlos (1813)

June
8 June - The Spanish frigate Thomas is captured by the Patriots.

July
27 July–August 10 - Siege of Chillán

August
3 August - Battle of Maipon
10 August - The Instituto Nacional General José Miguel Carrera, Chile's oldest school, is established.
17 August - Battle of Quirihue
23 August - Battle of Cauquenes

October
17 October - Battle of El Roble

Births

Deaths
3 March - Juan Martínez de Rozas (b. 1758)
21 May - José Antonio Pareja (b. 1757)

References 

 
Chile
Chile